National Map Reading Week is an awareness campaign originally created by the Ordnance Survey, Britain's National Mapping Agency. It runs annually in the third week of October.

The goal of the awareness week is to increase public use of maps and mapping services. This followed a public survey that demonstrated many British residents were unable to accurately place key cities on a map, including London and Birmingham.

The worry over loss of skills is not a new one: research by the British Library shows concerns were expressed by historian and cartographer John Brian Hartley over the loss of traditional map skills as digital mapping was developed in the 1980s.

References

External links
Royal Institute of Navigation: National Map Reading Week
South Downs National Park: National Map Reading Week 17 – 23 October 2016
Rohan: National Map Reading Week 17 – 23 October 2016
Devon Geography: Map Reading Week Is Coming!
Azimap: National Map Reading Week
Ohio State University: National Map Reading Week in the UK
Outdoor Industry Association newsletter Sep 2016 – National Map Reading Week

Ordnance Survey
Awareness weeks